Bessie Ella Hazen (1862–1946) was a Canadian-born American painter and printmaker.

Born in Waterford, New Brunswick,  Hazen studied at Columbia University and at the University of California, Los Angeles. Among her awards and honors were several second prizes in watercolor at the Arizona State Fair, in 1916, 1917, and 1919; first prize for realism in painting at the Art Teachers Association of Los Angeles, in 1924; a gold medal for watercolor at West Coast Arts, in 1926; and first prizes from the Ebell Club of Los Angeles, in 1931 and 1932. Groups to which she belonged included the California Art Club, the California Watercolor Society, the California Art Teachers Association, Women Painters of the West, the Arthur Wesley Dow Foundation, and the Pacific Art Association, and her work is in the collection of the Los Angeles County Museum of Art, among others. She lived and taught in Los Angeles.

Notes

References

1862 births
1946 deaths
American women painters
American women printmakers
American watercolorists
Women watercolorists
20th-century American painters
20th-century American women artists
People from Kings County, New Brunswick
Artists from New Brunswick
Artists from Los Angeles
Painters from California
Canadian emigrants to the United States
Columbia University alumni
University of California, Los Angeles alumni